Kevin Harrington may refer to:

 Kevin Harrington (actor) (born 1959), Australian actor 
 Kevin Harrington (entrepreneur) (born 1957), American entrepreneur
 Kevin B. Harrington (1929–2008), American politician in Massachusetts